Nowmaleh-ye Sofla (also Romanized as Nowmāleh-ye Soflá; also known as Nīm Allāh, Noh Māleh, and Now Māleh) is a village in Qaedrahmat Rural District, Zagheh District, Khorramabad County, Lorestan Province, Iran. At the 2006 census, its population was 39, in 7 families.

References 

Towns and villages in Khorramabad County